Emilio Almiñana was an Uruguayan footballer, he played as midfielder in Club Atlético Independiente.

Career 

Almiñana was born in Montevideo, city where began his football career, playing for Central Español. In 1932 he played in the Independiente team that lost the final against River Plate by 3-0. Almiñana played 37 games between 1932 and 1933.

References

External links 
www.lacalderadeldiablo.net

Argentine footballers
Footballers from Buenos Aires
Club Atlético Independiente footballers
Argentine people of Basque descent
Sportspeople from Avellaneda
Central Español players
Argentine people of Spanish descent
Association football midfielders
Year of birth missing